Flagstaff Mountain may refer to:
 Flagstaff Mountain (Boulder County, Colorado), a peak near Boulder, Colorado
 Flagstaff Mountain (Stevens County, Washington), a peak near Northport, Washington